Yeltsin Francisco Ortega Jacques (born 21 September 1991) is a visually impaired Brazilian Paralympic runner named after the former Russian president Boris Yeltsin. He won the 1500 m and 5000 m events at the 2015 Parapan American Games, placing 5th–11th at the 2016 Summer Paralympics. He also medaled in the 800 m and 1500 m events at the 2013 World Championships.

Notes

References

External links 

 
 
 

1991 births
Living people
Brazilian male middle-distance runners
Paralympic athletes of Brazil
Athletes (track and field) at the 2016 Summer Paralympics
Athletes (track and field) at the 2020 Summer Paralympics
Medalists at the 2020 Summer Paralympics
Paralympic gold medalists for Brazil
Paralympic medalists in athletics (track and field)